The Middle Hills are a mountain range in the Mojave Desert, within the Mojave National Preserve, in eastern San Bernardino County, southern California, United States.

References 

Mountain ranges of the Mojave Desert
Mojave National Preserve
Mountain ranges of San Bernardino County, California
Mountain ranges of Southern California